Sir John Pearce Luke  (16 July 1858 – 7 December 1931) was a New Zealand politician. Luke was Mayor of Wellington from 1913 to 1921 and Member of Parliament for Wellington Suburbs 1908–1911 and Wellington North 1918–1928. His brother Charles Manley Luke had previously also been Mayor of Wellington in 1895. Sir John Pearce was nicknamed Peanut because he was short.

Early life
Born at St Just, near Penzance, Cornwall, England, to Samuel and Ann Luke, John Luke came to New Zealand with his parents in July 1874 after the Cornish tin industry failed. He completed two years of an apprenticeship as an engineer before leaving for Feilding, New Zealand from where, the family were informed, they would be able to take up engineering work 50 kilometres away on the coast at Foxton while they developed the Fielding property. However, "When the Luke's landed at Wellington they discovered that Foxton was merely a paper township; it was a name on the map and the only industry there was the extraction of pipis from the beach by Maoris." Luke completed his engineering apprenticeship with The Lion Foundry, and worked on various projects before joining his father's newly established Te Aro Engineering Works in 1879. After initially struggling the business was successful and constructed several steamships. In June 1886 his oldest brother William died "after a short and painful illness in his 34th year" followed by his next oldest brother, Samuel, at 32 years of age, in December.

City council and mayor
Luke was first elected to the city council in 1898 and served between that year and 1911. He was responsible for the expansion of the Wellington tramway system. For many years he was president of the New Zealand Engineers and Iron Masters Association, and was actively associated with the Wellington Industrial Association, the Wellington District Hospital Board, the Wellington Technical Education Board, and the Navy League. The Returned Soldiers Association conferred upon them the honour of life membership of the organisation. Luke contested the 1905 Wellington City mayoral election and of the six candidates, he came fourth, with Thomas William Hislop elected.

Member of Parliament

His parliamentary career began in 1908 with his election as member for Wellington Suburbs for the Liberal Party, but he lost his seat at the 1911 general election to Reform candidate William Henry Dillon Bell. From 1911 until 1918 he was not a member of Parliament, and was defeated for Wellington South, standing now as a Reform candidate, by Labour's Alfred Hindmarsh in 1914. After the  he was put forward as a candidate for Speaker of the House of Representatives after the previous speaker Sir Frederic Lang lost his parliamentary seat. As the Reform government had lost their overall majority, Luke declined nomination for speaker to allow an independent MP, Charles Statham, to become speaker thereby helping the government's voting strength. He held this electorate continuously until the 1928 general election, when he was defeated by the Labour candidate Charles Chapman, by a margin of 47 votes.

Luke was married in 1880 to Jacobina McGregor. He appointed a Knight Bachelor in the 1921 King's Birthday Honours, having previously been made a Companion of the Order of St Michael and St George in the 1917 King's Birthday Honours. He was leader of the New Zealand delegation which visited South Africa in 1924 in connection with the Empire Parliamentary Association. He died suddenly on 7 December 1931, and was survived by his wife, four sons, and one daughter. His funeral service was held at St. Paul's Cathedral in Wellington, followed by a private cremation, with his ashes buried at Karori Cemetery.

Miscellanea
 Lukes Lane in the Wellington CBD is named after the family business, Lukes' Foundry, which was sited there; years later, Sir John Pearce's sons set up Luke Bros foundry near Chaffers Street. Lukes' Foundry built New Zealand's first steel ship, and several lighthouses.
 Sir John Pearce and his wife, Lady Jacobina Luke, donated the decorative iron gates at the entrance to Central Park, in Brooklyn, Wellington.
 Lady Luke was President of the Victoria League Wellington Branch from 1920 to 1922

References

Further reading

External links

 Taylor History – John Pearce Luke

|- 

1858 births
1931 deaths
New Zealand Companions of the Order of St Michael and St George
British emigrants to New Zealand
New Zealand people of Cornish descent
Mayors of Wellington
New Zealand businesspeople
New Zealand Knights Bachelor
New Zealand Liberal Party MPs
People from St Just in Penwith
Unsuccessful candidates in the 1911 New Zealand general election
Unsuccessful candidates in the 1928 New Zealand general election
Unsuccessful candidates in the 1914 New Zealand general election
Members of the New Zealand House of Representatives
New Zealand MPs for Wellington electorates
Reform Party (New Zealand) MPs
Wellington City Councillors
Wellington Hospital Board members
New Zealand politicians awarded knighthoods